Raymond Park may refer to:

Ray Park, Scottish actor, author and martial artist
Raymond Park, Brisbane, a park in Kangaroo Point, Brisbane, Queensland, Australia
 Raymond Park (Portland, Oregon)